Dimitris Mpena (born 9 July 1996) is a Greek footballer, who currently plays for Ethnikos Piraeus in the Football League 2 as a centre back. He broke through the first team in 2012 and learned a lot under the guidance of Giorgos Syros.

References
Ethnikos Piraeus team 2017/18

1996 births
Living people
Greek footballers
Ethnikos Piraeus F.C. players
Association football central defenders
People from Vlorë